Cattle raiding is the act of stealing cattle. In Australia, such stealing is often referred to as duffing, and the perpetrator as a duffer.In other areas, especially in Queensland, the practice is known as poddy-dodging with the perpetrator known as a poddy-dodger. In North America, especially in the Wild West cowboy culture, cattle theft is dubbed rustling, while an individual who engages in it is a rustler.

Historical cattle raiding
The act of cattle-raiding is quite ancient, first attested over seven thousand years ago, and is one of the oldest-known aspects of Proto-Indo-European culture, being seen in inscriptions on artifacts such as the Norse Golden Horns of Gallehus and in works such as the Old Irish Táin Bó Cúailnge ("Cattle Raid of Cooley"), the paṇis of the Rigveda, the Mahabharata cattle raids and cattle rescues; and the Homeric Hymn to Hermes, who steals the cattle of Apollo.

Central Asia
In his childhood, the Turco-Mongol conqueror Timur and a small band of followers raided travelers for goods, especially animals such as sheep, horses, and cattle. Around 1363, it is believed that Timur tried to steal a sheep from a shepherd but was shot by two arrows, one in his right leg and another in his right hand, where he lost two fingers. Both injuries disabled him for life. Timur's injuries have given him the names of Timur the Lame and Tamerlane by Europeans.

Ireland & Britain

In Gaelic Ireland, cattle raiding, whether in response to an insult or to gain food during a difficult winter, was a common part of warfare between Irish clans, as is often depicted in stories from Irish mythology, such as the Táin Bó Cúailnge and the Táin Bó Flidhais. Cattle raiding and selling protection against theft continued by Irish clan chiefs and rapparees, particularly against the estates of Anglo-Irish landlords, well into the 18th century in Ireland. 

During the 17th and 18th centuries, many Scottish clan chiefs would similarly operate an extralegal Watch over the cattle herds of the Lowland gentry in return for protection money, which the Chiefs used to feed the families of their tenants and clansmen. Any cattle that were stolen from herds under the Chiefs' Watch were either retrieved, or paid for in full.

Cattle-raiding by the Border reivers was a serious problem for many centuries on both sides of the Anglo-Scottish border.

American Old West

In the American frontier, rustling was considered a serious offense and in some cases resulted in vigilantes hanging or shooting the thieves.

One cause of tensions between Mexico and the United States in the years leading up to the Mexican–American War (of 1846–1848) was the frequent raiding of cattle by Native Americans from north of the border. Mexico's military and diplomatic capabilities had declined after it attained independence which left the northern half of the country vulnerable to the Apache, Comanche, and Navajo. These tribes, especially the Comanche, took advantage of Mexico's weakness by undertaking large-scale raids hundreds of miles deep into the country to steal livestock for their own use and to supply an expanding market in Texas and the United States.  These raids left thousands of people dead and devastated northern Mexico. When American troops entered northern Mexico in 1846 they found a demoralized people and little resistance from the civilian population.

Mexican rustlers were a major issue during the American Civil War (1861–1865); the Mexican government was accused of supporting the habit. American rustlers also stole Mexican cattle from across the border. Failure to brand new calves facilitated theft.

Conflict over alleged rustling was a major issue in the Johnson County War of 1892 in Wyoming.

The transition from open range to fenced grazing gradually reduced the practice of rustling in North America. In the 20th century, so called "suburban rustling" became more common, with rustlers anesthetizing cattle and taking them directly to auction. This often takes place at night, posing problems for law enforcement, because on very large ranches it can take several days for the loss of cattle to be noticed and reported. Convictions are rare to nonexistent.

Chile and Argentina

Cattle raiding became a major issue at the end of the 19th century in Argentina, where cattle stolen during malones were taken through Camino de los chilenos across the Andes to Chile, where they were exchanged for alcoholic beverages and firearms. Several indigenous groups and outlaws, such as the Boroano and Ranquel peoples, and the Pincheira brothers, ravaged the southern frontier of Argentina in search of cattle. To prevent the cattle raiding, the Argentine government built a system of trenches called Zanja de Alsina in the 1870s. Most cattle raids ended after the military campaigns of the Conquest of the Desert in the 1870s, and the following partition of Patagonia established by the Boundary Treaty of 1881 between Chile and Argentina.

In a letter to Chilean President Manuel Montt Mapuche chief Mañil denounced the plunder of graves in search of Mapuche silver, arson of Mapuche houses and other abuses against Mapuches that were happening in the newly created province. Mañil further accused intendant Villalón con Salbo of becoming rich by cattle theft.

The return of Chilean veterans from the War of the Pacific coincided with the Chilean Army's crushing of Mapuche resistance in the Occupation of Araucanía (1861–1883). This led to opportunities for bandits and veterans-turned-bandits to immigrate to the newly opened Araucanía territory, leading to sudden rise in violence and in a region that was recovering from Chilean-Mapuche warfare. Bandits that immigrated to Araucanía allied with displaced Mapuche and made cattle theft their chief business. Stolen cattle was sold in marketplaces through the region.

Contemporary cattle raiding (1990–present)

East Africa

The Pokot and Samburu Nilotic populations in northwestern Kenya often raid each other for cattle. Violent cattle rustling has caused massive loss of lives such as the Monday 12 March 2001 raid among the Marakwet in Murkutwo Location, Elgeyo Marakwet County, suspected to have been caused by the Pokot.

Sudan

Conflict over pastures and cattle raids has been happening between Dinka and Nuer as they battle for grazing their animals.

Cattle rustling is a major problem in rural areas of South Sudan. In the state of Jonglei, cattle raids in August 2011 left around 600 people dead. Once again in January 2012, ethnic clashes related to cattle theft killed between 2,000 and 3,000 people and displaced as many as 34,500 in the area around Pibor.

West Africa

Cattle rustling is common in Nigeria.

Israel
The theft of sheep, goats and cows along with tractors and irrigation equipment, is one of the most difficult problems confronted by farmers in Israel. About 400 cases are reported annually in the north of the country, and in the south, farmers compare the situation to the Wild West. They suffer millions of shekels in annual losses. Most of the stolen livestock is taken to the West Bank, quickly slaughtered and then smuggled back into Israel, where it is sold by butchers to unsuspecting customers.

See also

Beefsteak Raid
Border Reivers
Captain Starlight
Horse theft
Jack Sully
Nomadic conflict
Cattle raiding in Kenya
Ritual warfare
Slave raiding 
Sudanese nomadic conflicts

References

Further reading
 
 
 
 
 

Cattle
Illegal occupations
Animal theft
American frontier
Organized crime activity